Liv Glacier is a steep valley glacier,  long, emerging from the Antarctic Plateau just southeast of Barnum Peak and draining north through the Queen Maud Mountains to enter Ross Ice Shelf between Mayer Crags and Duncan Mountains. It was discovered in 1911 by Roald Amundsen, who named it for the daughter of Fridtjof Nansen.  The airway above the Liv Glacier was used by the monoplane Floyd Bennett in 1929 as the route for the first journey to the South Pole by air.
We have investigated the geochemistry of supraglacial streams on the Canada Glacier, Taylor Valley, Antarctica during the 2001–2002 austral summer. Canada Glacier supraglacial streams represent the link between primary precipitation (i.e. glacier snow) and proglacial Lake Hoare. Canada Glacier supraglacial stream geochemistry is intermediate between glacier snow and proglacial stream geochemistry with average concentrations of 49.1 μeq L−1 Ca2+, 19.9 μeq L−1 SO 2−4, and 34.3 μeq L−1 HCO −3. Predominant west to east winds lead to a redistribution of readily soluble salts onto the glacier surface, which is reflected in the geochemistry of the supraglacial streams. Western Canada Glacier supraglacial streams have average SO 2−4:HCO −3 equivalent ratios of 1.0, while eastern supraglacial streams average 0.5, suggesting more sulfate salts reach and dissolve in the western supraglacial streams. A graph of HCO −3 versus Ca2+ for western and eastern supraglacial streams had slopes of 0.87 and 0.72, respectively with R2 values of 0.84 and 0.83. Low concentrations of reactive silicate (> 10 μmol L−1) in the supraglacial streams suggested that little to no silicate weathering occurred on the glacier surface with the exception of cryoconite holes (1000 μmol L−1). Therefore, the major geochemical weathering process occurring in the supraglacial streams is believed to be calcite dissolution. Proglacial stream, Anderson Creek, contains higher concentrations of major ions than supraglacial streams containing 5 times the Ca2+ and 10 times the SO 2−4. Canada Glacier proglacial streams also contain higher concentrations (16.6–30.6 μeq L−1) of reactive silicate than supraglacial streams. This suggests that the controls on glacier meltwater geochemistry switch from calcite and gypsum dissolution to both salt dissolution and silicate mineral weathering as the glacier meltwater evolves. Our chemical mass balance calculations indicate that of the total discharge into Lake Hoare, the final recipient of Canada Glacier meltwater, 81.9% is from direct glacier runoff and 19.1% is from proglacial Andersen Creek. Although during a typical, low melt ablation season Andersen Creek contributes over 40% of the water added to Lake Hoare, its overall chemical importance is diluted by the direct inputs from Canada Glacier during high flow years. Decadal warming events, such as the 2001–2002 austral summer produce supraglacial streams that are a major source of water to Lake Hoare.

References

Queen Maud Mountains
Glaciers of Amundsen Coast
Glaciers of Dufek Coast